Jarrod Patrick "Chunky" Clements (born December 3, 1994) is a former American football defensive tackle. He played college football at Illinois.

Professional career

Minnesota Vikings
Clements signed with the Minnesota Vikings as an undrafted free agent on July 21, 2017. He was waived by the Vikings on September 2, 2017.

Houston Texans
On October 25, 2017, Clements was signed to the Houston Texans' practice squad. He was promoted to the active roster on November 8, 2017. He was waived on December 15, 2017, and re-signed to the practice squad the next day. He was promoted back to the active roster on December 19, 2017.

On March 21, 2018, Clements was waived by the Texans.

Los Angeles Rams
On May 21, 2018, Clements signed with the Los Angeles Rams. He was waived on August 31, 2018.

Arizona Hotshots
On January 8, 2019, Clements was signed by the Arizona Hotshots of the Alliance of American Football. He was waived after the first regular season game on February 12, 2019.

Indianapolis Colts
On May 28, 2019, Clements signed with the Indianapolis Colts. On June 13, 2019, the Colts cut Clements.

References

External links
Houston Texans bio
Illinois Fighting Illini bio

1994 births
Living people
Arizona Hotshots players
Houston Texans players
Illinois Fighting Illini football players
Indianapolis Colts players
Los Angeles Rams players
Minnesota Vikings players
Players of American football from Dayton, Ohio
American football defensive tackles